GK Software SE is a listed technology company headquartered in Schöneck/Vogtland. The company specializes in software and services for the operation of large retail company branches. GK employs about 1,114 individuals at sixteen locations worldwide. The name stands for the initials of the two founders of the company, Rainer Gläß and Stephan Kronmüller. According to the fiscal year 2021 annual report, GK Software achieved revenue of €130.8 million.

History
Rainer Gläß and Stephan Kronmüller founded G&K Datensysteme GmbH in Schöneck/Vogtland in 1990. After successful growth, the company was converted into a stock corporation in 2001 and in 2008 went public in the Prime Standard of Deutsche Börse.

Solquest Gmbh was acquired by GK in 2009. In 2012, the acquisition of the AWEK Group considerably reinforced the services business segment of the company. GK Software acquired the retail segment of DBS Data Business Systems Inc., a US-based Point of Sale software specialist, in 2015. In the fall of 2017, GK Software announced that it would acquire a majority stake in AG's prudsys. The company with Chemnitz and Berlin locations is specialized in creating real-time personalization solutions in retail software. Artificial intelligence is used for this purpose. Since September 2022, prudsys AG has been trading as GK Artificial Intelligence for Retail AG within the GK Group.  Deutsche Fiskal is a wholly-owned subsidiary of GK Software and was founded in 2019 to develop and operate an open cloud solution to implement legal requirements within the framework of German fiscalization. The Berlin-based company draws on the development resources and expertise of GK Software, whose solutions meet the legal requirements of local tax authorities in over 20 countries. The Fiskal Cloud and Fiskal Cloud Offline solutions are developed in close partnership with Bundesdruckerei and are available to all retailers and providers of recording systems (e.g., cash registers). 2020 saw the founding of retail7 GmbH, which develops and sells a cloud POS system optimized for small and medium-sized companies. In addition to the Berlin headquarters, there are additional locations in Jena, Pilsen, and Schöneck.

In 2010, CEO Rainer Gläß was awarded the Ernst & Young business award as entrepreneur of the year. The Munich Strategy Group awarded GK Software a third place rank on the list of the most successful German mid-size enterprises in 2013.

The company maintains sixteen locations in Germany, as well as in South Africa, the United States, Russia, Ukraine, Switzerland, Singapore, France, Australia and in the Czech Republic.

The company distributes standard and cloud-based software solutions for the retail industry under the name GK CLOUD4RETAIL. This includes software for Point of Sale (POS), Backoffice, merchandise management, Store Device Control, sales promotion, administration of vouchers, automatic label printing, Open Scale and Monitoring.

In 2009, SAP initially took over the distribution of two products. This has now extended to five products, whose distribution is aimed globally since 2013.

In January 2020, GK Software announced a technology partnership with Kronos Incorporated to embed Workforce Dimensions suite into the OmniPOS platform.

References

Software companies of Germany
Companies based in Saxony
Multinational companies headquartered in Germany
German companies established in 1990